The Ferrari 290 MM was a sports racing car produced by Ferrari in 1956. It was developed to compete in the 1956 edition of Mille Miglia, hence the acronym "MM", and four cars were built.

Development
The 290 MM was powered by a new 3.5 litre, 60° Jano V12.

The car won the 1956 Mille Miglia, raced by Eugenio Castellotti, while another 290 MM, driven by Juan Manuel Fangio, finished fourth. Phil Hill and Maurice Trintignant also won the Swedish Grand Prix of that year, granting Ferrari the overall victory in the 1956 World Sportscar Championship. The following year a 290 MM won the 1000 km Buenos Aires.

On December 10, 2015, RM Sotheby's sold the 290 MM driven by Juan Manuel Fangio in the 1956 Mille Miglia at auction for US$28 million — the highest price for a car sold in 2015 and the third most expensive ever at that time. In 2018, another example sold for US$22 million.

References

Bibliography

External links

Ferrari 290 MM: Ferrari History

290 MM
Sports racing cars
Mille Miglia